is a former Japanese football player.

Club statistics

References

External links

jsgoal.jp

1981 births
Living people
Aichi Gakuin University alumni
Association football people from Toyama Prefecture
Japanese footballers
J2 League players
Japan Football League players
Kataller Toyama players
Association football forwards